Lawrence Fried (June 28, 1926 – 1983) was an American photo-journalist. He was born to first-generation Jewish Hungarian and Russian parents in New York, N. Y. Fried's work appeared in Newsweek, The Saturday Evening Post, The New York Times, Vogue, Collier's, and Parade Magazine.[1] with over 70 covers for Newsweek [2]. He was the recipient of the Photographer of the Year award by the Overseas Press Club, the Outstanding Service to ASMP award and the Benjamin Franklin Award [3].

Fried learned photography while serving in World War II. After the war he attended the University of Miami, then moved to New York City. In the 1950s and early 1960s he worked through the PIX, Inc. alongside friends Cornell Capa, Ed Feingersh,  George Karger, and Hans Knopf. There he began a 30-year career as a freelance photographer. He was a three-term president of the American Society of Magazine Photographers, a trade organization, and a founding partner of the Image Bank, which represents the work of 300 photographers.[5]

The people and subjects that he photographed on multiple occasions range from Vietnam [6] to world leaders such as  Chiang Kai-shek [7]. His photograph of Robert F. Kennedy was chosen as the book cover of Kennedy's To Seek a Newer World [8].  While riding in the presidential motorcade covering Lyndon Johnson for the Saturday Evening Post [9] his car caught on fire and his leap—cameras flinging in the air—was captured on the front page of many major newspapers including The New York Daily News.[10]

He photographed musicians, actors, and visual artists throughout his career.  Bette Midler [11],  Stevie Wonder [12],  Meryl Streep [13], Shirley MacLaine [14], Richard Serra [15], Joseph Kosuth [16], and Willem de Kooning [17], Audrey Hepburn.[19]

ASMP 

Fried was a three-term president of the American Society of Magazine Photographers from 1973-1978, a trade organization and was instrumental in the development of the first Business Practices book in 1973.[4].

The Image Bank 

In 1975, Fried co-founded The Image Bank, which became one of the largest agencies of its kind with franchises all over the world. TIB created a new model of selling stock photography that is followed to this day [18].  Getty Images bought the company in 2000.

References 

 "Lawrence Fried."  The New York Times 12 September 1983: Print.
 "Obituary." Newsweek.  September 26, 1983
 Overseas Press Club https://www.opcofamerica.org/
 ASMP Bulletin NOV/DEC. 1978: Print. 1-5 and ASMP Bulletin October, 1973: Print.
 Op. Cit. The New York Times
"Can Vietnam Stand Alone?' Newsweek. 16 December 1968:  Cover.  Print.
 "Asia After the Peking Summit." Newsweek. 13 March 1972: Cover.  Print.
 Kennedy, Robert F. To Seek A Newer World. New York:  Doubleday & Company, 1967.  Print 
 "L.B.J. His Whirlwind Campaign." Saturday Evening Post 31 October 1964:  Cover.  Print.
 "LBJ Mobbed And He Loves It." 'The New York Daily News 24 September 1964:  Cover.  Print. 
 Newsweek. 17 December 1973: Cover.  Print.
 Newsweek 28 October 1974: Cover.  Print.
 Newsweek 7 January 1980: Cover.  Print.
 Newsweek 25 September 1972:  Cover.  Print.
 David Zwirner Gallery, New York. NY www.davidswirner.com
 Gauthier, Michel.  "Art Conceptuel." Paris:  Editions du Centre Pompidou, 2013. Print.
 Newsweek 4 September 1972: 71-72. Print.
Frosh, Berg. The Image Factory: Consumer Culture, Photography and the Visual Content Industry'." Berg, 2003, Oxford, UK. Print.
Pepper, Terence and Trompeteler, Helen. "Audrey Hepburn: Portraits of an Icon." National Portrait Gallery, London, 2016.
The Image Bank

External links
Lawrence Fried official site
Past presidents of ASMP

1926 births
1983 deaths
American photojournalists